Urn is the third studio album by Australian metal band Ne Obliviscaris, released on 27 October 2017 via Season of Mist. It was released to Patreon contributors a few days earlier. It is the first album not to feature former bassist Brendan "Cygnus" Brown, who left the band in early 2017 due to his allegations of domestic violence. Robin Zielhorst, former member of Cynic and Exivious, was recruited as their session bassist for the album.

The first single from the album, "Intra Venus", was released on 27 July 2017, accompanying a music video. On 29 August 2017, the band released another song, "Urn (Part I) – And Within the Void We Are Breathless". The third song, "Urn (Part II) – As Embers Dance in Our Eyes" was made available for streaming on 10 October 2017.

Track listing

Personnel
Credits are adapted from the album's liner notes.

Ne Obliviscaris
 Tim Charles – clean vocals, violin
 Xenoyr – harsh vocals
 Matt Klavins – guitars, egg shaker 
 Benjamin Baret – lead guitar
 Daniel Presland – drums

Additional musicians
 Robin Zielhorst – bass guitar
 Tim Hennessy – cello 
 Emma Charles – violin 
 Natalija May – violin 
 Alana K Vocal, Alex Beckitt, Alex Hutchinson, Alex Koumoundouros, Alex Van Blyderveen, Alex Warren, Alexander Jackson, Amy Di Giambattista, Andrew Shugg, Cory Atkinson, Elisa Alleblas, Jacob James, James Wingfield, Karlo Doroc, Lewis Allan, Matthew Holmes, Meredith Rouse, Mitchell Shine, Nerrilee Morale, Xavier Beckitt – choir vocals 

Production and design
 Troy McCosker − producer, engineering
 Ne Obliviscaris − co-producer
 Mark Lewis − producer , engineering , re-amping , mixing, mastering
 Xenoyr − artwork

Charts

References

2017 albums
Ne Obliviscaris (band) albums
Season of Mist albums
Albums produced by Mark Lewis (music producer)